Iouri Iourеvich Podladtchikov (born 13 September 1988) is a Russian-born Swiss snowboarder. He rides goofy stance. He has competed since 2000. He won the gold medal for the halfpipe at the 2014 Winter Olympics in Sochi.

Career
Russian-born Podladtchikov grew up in Davos, Switzerland, and started snowboarding in 2000. He changed nationality after competing for Russia in Turin at age 17. In the final rankings he was 37th.

Graduated from Sports High Pool Davos in 2008. Podladtchikov, known on the circuit as I-Pod, won the halfpipe World Cup title in 2008. In December 2008, he won the Zurich Sports Award Team/Individual athlete. He won silver at Winter X Games XIV in 2010.

In 2013, he won the gold medal at the FIS Snowboarding World Championship. He placed fourth at the 2010 Winter Olympics in Vancouver for Switzerland. At the 2014 Winter Olympics, he won the gold medal in the men's halfpipe.

At the Winter X Games Europe in 2010, Podladtchikov successfully landed a Double McTwist 1260, putting him in first place with a score of 98.00, the second highest in Winter X Games history. Podladtchikov is the only other person in the world besides Shaun White, Ben Stewart, and Markus Malin that has landed a Double McTwist 1260.

Podladtchikov also competes regularly at major events on the Swatch TTR World Snowboard Tour. He finished the 06/07 season as world no. 6 on the Swatch TTR World Ranking List and had five top-10 finishes on the TTR Tour in 07/08. His 2009/10 season on the TTR Tour has been successful, with two wins at Swatch TTR halfpipe events, the 6Star O'Neill Evolution 2010 and the 5Star Burton Canadian Open. His win came after a couple of second places at the Dew Tour and Winter XGames. He finished the 2009/10 season as world no. 2, right behind TTR World Tour Champion, Peetu Piiroinen of Finland.

Pepe Regazzi and Marco Bruni are his Swiss coaches.

His nickname is IPod, taken from the vowel i of his first name and the first syllable of his last name.

First rider to perform a Cab double cork 1440° in a halfpipe competition, a move he called the "YOLO Flip." This trick is a derivative of the Haakon Flip created by Terje Haakonsen in the early 1990s, which is essentially hitting a transition switch stance and performing a frontside 180° back to your regular stance and then into a McTwist (originated by the skateboarder Mike McGill), which is a backside inverted 540° spin: so in total it is a spin with two full rotations into a 720°.

Variations of this have evolved into the 540°, 720°, 900°, 1080°, 1260° and now the 1440°. Professional skateboarder and athlete Danny Way performed a version of the Haakon Flip on a skateboard on a halfpipe with minimal recognition several years prior to its being introduced into the snowboard world.

Due to the series of traumas, he ends competitive career by 2020.

Personal life
"Ipod" has a fraternal twin that he shared a bedroom with for 15 years. He now is studying abroad at Pacific Northwest College of the Art to get his bachelor of fine arts (for his fall semester of 2022). As an avid photographer and art enjoyer he likes to go to the beach.

Best event results
Winter Olympic Games
2014, Gold Medal, Men's Halfpipe Sochi Russia*
2010 4th Place, Men's Halfpipe Vancouver Canada
TTR
2009, 3rd Place, 6Star Burton European Open Halfpipe
2008, 3rd Place, 4Star Fiat Rock the Spot Halfpipe
2008, 4th Place, 6Star Burton European Open Halfpipe
2007, 2nd Place, 6Star O'Neill Evolution Halfpipe
2007, 2nd Place, 6Star Burton European Open Halfpipe
FIS-World Cup
2009, 2nd Place, Halfpipe Cardrona NZE  World Cup
2007, 1st Place, Halfpipe, Saas Fee World Cup   
2007, 1st Place, Halfpipe,  Saas Fee  Europa Cup

References

External links
 
 
 
 
Vancouver profile 
TEDx talk

1988 births
Living people
Medalists at the 2014 Winter Olympics
Naturalised citizens of Switzerland
Olympic gold medalists for Switzerland
Olympic medalists in snowboarding
Olympic snowboarders of Russia
Olympic snowboarders of Switzerland
People from Davos
Russian emigrants to Switzerland
Russian male snowboarders
Snowboarders at the 2006 Winter Olympics
Snowboarders at the 2010 Winter Olympics
Snowboarders at the 2014 Winter Olympics
Sportspeople from Moscow
Swiss male snowboarders
X Games athletes